Jean-Claude Mpassy-Nzoumba (born 27 May 1986 in Ilmenau) is a professional footballer who plays for SC Columbia Floridsdorf. Born in Germany, he has represented the Congo national team.

International
His debut in the national team was on 8 June 2008 in Brazzaville vs. Sudan.

External links
 
 FIFA

1986 births
Living people
People from Ilmenau
People from Bezirk Suhl
German people of Republic of the Congo descent
German footballers
Footballers from Thuringia
Association football defenders
Association football midfielders
Republic of the Congo footballers
Republic of the Congo international footballers
1. FC Saarbrücken players
Berliner FC Dynamo players
1. FC Kaiserslautern II players
1. FC Kaiserslautern players
SV Elversberg players
FC Hansa Rostock players
FC 08 Homburg players